This is a list of Royal Navy ship names starting with the letters O, P and Q.

O

 O1
 Oak
 Oakham Castle
 Oakington
 Oakley
 Obdurate
 Obedient
 Oberon
 Observateur
 Observer
 Ocean
 
 Oceanway
 Ocelot
 Ockham
 Octavia
 Odiham
 Odin
 Odzani
 Offa
 Ogre
 Oiseau
 Okehampton
 Old Francis
 Old James
 Old Lawrence
 Old President
 Old Roebuck
 Old Success
 Old Truelove
 Old Warwick
 Olive Branch
 Olympia
 Olympus
 Omdurman
 Onondaga
 Onslaught
 Onslow
 Ontario
 Onyx
 Opal
 Ophelia
 Opossum
 Opportune
 Oracle
 
 Orange Tree
 Orangeville
 Orby
 Orcadia
 Orchis
 Oreste
 Orestes
 
 Orford Ness
 Orford Prize
 Oriana
 Oribi
 Oriflamme
 Orilla
 Oriole
 Orion
 Orissa
 Orkan
 Orkney
 Orlando
 
 Ormonde
 Ornen
 Oronoque
 Orontes
 Oroonoko
 Orpheus
 Orquijo
 Ortenzia
 Orwell
 Oryx
 Osborne
 Osiris
 Osprey
 Ossington
 Ossory
 Ostend
 Ostrich
 Oswald
 Oswego
 Oswestry Castle
 Otranto
 Otter
 Otus
 Oudenarde
 Oulston
 Oundle
 Ouragan
 Ouse
 Overton
 Overyssel
 
 Owen Glendower
 Owl
 Owners Adventure
 Owners Goodwill
 Owners Love
 
 Oxford Castle
 Oxlip

P

 P11
 P12
 P13
 P14
 P15
 P16
 P17
 P18
 P19
 P20
 P21
 P22
 P23
 P24
 P25
 P26
 P27
 P28
 P29
 P30
 P31
 P32
 P33
 P34
 P35
 P36
 P37
 P38
 P39
 P40
 P41
 P45
 P46
 P47
 P48
 P49
 P50
 P52
 P53
 P54
 P57
 P58
 P59
 P64
 P222
 P311
 P411
 P412
 P413
 P511
 P512
 P514
 P551
 P552
 P553
 P554
 P555
 P556
 P611
 P612
 P614
 P615
 P711
 P712
 P714
 Pacific
 Packahunta
 Packington
 Pactolus
 
 
 Pagham
 Pakenham
 Paladin
 Palinurus
 Pallas
 Palliser
 Palm Tree
 Palma
 Palomares
 Paluma
 Pandora
 Pandour
 Pangbourne
 Panglima
 Pansy
 Pantaloon
 Panther
 Papillon
 Papua
 Paradox
 Paragon
 Paramour
 Parapet
 Paris
 Parker
 Parkes
 Parret
 Parrot
 Parrsboro
 Parry Sound
 Parthian
 Partridge
 Pasley
 Pat Barton
 Pathan
 Pathfinder
 Patrician
 Patrick
 Patriot
 Patrol
 Patroller
 Patton
 Paul
 Paulina
 Pauncey
 Paz
 PC42
 PC43
 PC44
 PC51
 PC55
 PC56
 PC60
 PC61
 PC62
 PC63
 PC65
 PC66
 PC67
 PC68
 PC69
 PC70
 PC71
 PC72
 PC73
 PC74
 Peace
 Peacock
 Peard
 
 Pearl Prize
 Pearlen
 Pedro
 Pegase
 Pegasus
 Peggy
 Pegwell Bay
 Pelargonium
 
 Pelican Prize
 Pellew
 Pelorus
 Pelter
 
 
 Pembroke Castle
 Pembroke Prize
 Penang
 
 Pendennis Castle
 Penelope
 Penetang
 Penguin
 Penlee Point
 Penn
 Pennywort
 Pentstemon
 Penston
 Penylan
 Penzance
 Peony
 Pera
 Perdrix
 
 Peregrine Galley
 Peregrine Prize
 Perim
 Periwinkle
 Perlen
 
 Perseus
 Perseverance
 Persian
 Persimmon
 Persistent
 Pert
 Perth
 Peruvian
 Pesaquid
 Pet
 Petard
 Peter Pomegranate
 Peter
 Peterborough
 Peterel
 Peterell
 Peterhead
 Peterman
 Petersfield
 Petersham
 Petite Victoire
 Petrel
 Petrolla
 Petulant
 Petunia
 Pevensey Castle
 Peyton
 Phaeton
 Pheasant
 
 Philip & Mary
 Phillimore
 Philoctetes
 Philomel
 Phipps
 Phlegethon
 Phlox
 Phoebe
 Phoenix
 Phosphorus
 Pickle
 Picotee
 Picton
 Pictou
 Piemontaise
 Piercer
 Pigeon
 Pigmy
 Pigot
 Pike
 Pilchard
 Pilford
 Pilot
 
 Pimpernel
 Pincher
 Pineham
 Pink
 Pinner
 Pintail
 Pioneer
 Piorun
 Pique
 Pirie
 Pirouette
 Pitcairn
 Pitt
 Pittington
 Placentia
 Planet
 Plantagenet
 Plassy
 Platy Prize
 Platypus
 Plessisville
 Plover
 Plucky
 Plumper
 Plumpton
 Pluto
 Plym
 
 Plymouth Prize
 Plymouth Transport
 
 Pochard
 Podargus
 Poictiers
 Pointe Claire
 Polacca
 Polar Circle
 Polaris
 Polecat
 Pollington
 Pollux
 Polperro
 Polruan
 Polsham
 Polyanthus
 Polyphemus
 Pomona
 Pomone
 Pompee
 Pondicherry
 Pontypool
 Poole
 Popham
 Popinjay
 Poppy
 Porcupine
 Porgey
 
 
 Porpoise
 Port Antonio
 Port Arthur
 Port Colborne
 Port d'Espagne
 Port Hope
 Port Mahon
 Port Morant
 Port Royal
 Port Wespagne
 Portage
 Portchester Castle
 Portcullis
 Porthleven
 Portia
 Portisham
 
 Portland Bill
 Portland Prize
 Porto
 Portreath
 
 Portsmouth Prize
 Portsmouth Shallop
 Portway
 Poseidon
 Post
 Postboy
 Postillion
 Potentilla
 Poulette
 Poulmic
 Pouncer
 Poundmaker
 Powderham
 Powerful
 Pozarica
 Premier
 Prescott
 President
 Prestatyn
 Preston
 Prestonian
 Prevention
 Prevost
 Prevoyante
 Primrose
 Primula
 Prince
 Prince Albert
 Prince Arthur
 Prince Augustus Frederick
 Prince Charles
 Prince Consort
 Prince de Neuchatel
 Prince Edward
 Prince Eugene
 Prince Frederick
 Prince George
 Prince Henry
 Prince Leopold
 Prince of Orange
 Prince of Wales
 Prince Regent
 Prince Royal
 Prince Rupert
 Prince William
 Princess
 Princess Alice
 Princess Amelia
 Princess Anne
 Princess Augusta
 Princess Carolina
 Princess Caroline
 Princess Charlotte
 
 
 
 Princess Louisa
 Princess Margaret
 Princess Maria
 Princess Mary
 Princess of Orange
 Princess Royal
 Princess Sophia Frederica
 Princessa
 Princesse
 Prins Albert
 Prinses Astrid
 Prinses Beatrix
 Privet
 Prize
 Procris
 
 
 Progresso
 Prohibition
 Project
 Prometheus
 Prompt Prize
 Prompt
 Prompte
 Proselyte
 Proserpine
 Prosperity
 Prospero
 Prosperous
 Protea
 Protector
 Proteus
 Prothee
 
 Providence Prize
 Provo
 Prowse
 Prudent
 Prudente
 Psyche
 Puck
 Puckeridge
 Puffin
 Puissant
 Pulham
 Pultusk
 Puma
 Pumba
 Puncher
 Puncheston
 Punjab
 Punjabi
 Punjaub
 Puntoone
 Pursuer
 Puttenham
 Pyl
 Pylades
 Pyramus
 Pyrrhus
 Pytchley
 Python

Q

 Quadra
 Quadrant
 Quadrille
 Quail
 Quainton
 Quaker
 Qualicum
 Quality
 Quantock
 Quebec
 Queen
 Queen Charlotte
 Queen Elizabeth
 Queen Emma
 Queen Mab
 Queen Mary
 Queen of Kent
 Queenborough
 Quentin
 Quesnel
 Quest
 Quiberon
 Quickmatch
 Quilliam
 Quinte
 Quittance
 Quorn

See also
 List of aircraft carriers of the Royal Navy
 List of amphibious warfare ships of the Royal Navy
 List of battlecruisers of the Royal Navy
 List of pre-dreadnought battleships of the Royal Navy
 List of dreadnought battleships of the Royal Navy
 List of cruiser classes of the Royal Navy
 List of destroyer classes of the Royal Navy
 List of patrol vessels of the Royal Navy
 List of frigate classes of the Royal Navy
 List of mine countermeasure vessels of the Royal Navy (includes minesweepers and mine hunters)
 List of monitors of the Royal Navy
 List of Royal Fleet Auxiliary ship names
 List of Royal Navy shore establishments
 List of submarines of the Royal Navy
 List of survey vessels of the Royal Navy

References
 

 O
Names O
Royal Navy O
Royal Navy ships O